Christine Vachon (born November 21, 1962) is an American film producer active in the American independent film sector.

Christine Vachon produced Todd Haynes' first feature, Poison, which was awarded the Grand Jury Prize at the 1991 Sundance Film Festival. Since then, she has gone on to produce many acclaimed American independent films, including Far from Heaven (nominated for four Academy Awards), Boys Don't Cry (Academy Award winner), One Hour Photo, Hedwig and the Angry Inch, Happiness, Velvet Goldmine, Safe, I Shot Andy Warhol, Go Fish, Swoon, I'm Not There, Gigantic, Cracks. and Cairo Time. Her latest and upcoming projects include a short film collaboration with ACE Hotel and online film content producers Massify entitled "Lulu at the Ace Hotel" as well as a five-part HBO mini-series adaptation of James M. Cain's 1941 novel, Mildred Pierce.

Vachon also participates as a member of the Jury for the NYICFF, a paramount New York City Film Festival dedicated to screening films for children between the ages of 3 and 18.

Early life
Vachon was born in Manhattan, New York City. She is the daughter of Françoise Fourestier and photographer John Vachon.

Career
She graduated from Brown University in 1983, where she met fellow alums director Todd Haynes and Barry Ellsworth. Together, they created Apparatus Productions in 1987, a non-profit company deeply inspired by the anti-Hollywood New York film scene and oversaw the production of seven films in five years. Most notoriously, Apparatus produced Haynes' controversial Superstar: The Karen Carpenter Story, a film depicting the dramatic rise and fall of the anorexic pop star. To make financial ends meet, Vachon became a proofreader by night. She also took on odd jobs in the film industry to learn the trade.

Killer Films
Vachon and fellow New York producer Pamela Koffler currently run Killer Films, which was established in 1996. The company celebrated its 10th anniversary in 2005 and was honored with a retrospective at the Museum of Modern Art in New York.

Her first feature Poison (written and directed by Academy Award nominee Todd Haynes) won the Grand Jury Prize at Sundance in 1991. Since that initial success Christine has worked on a number of noteworthy films, including I Shot Andy Warhol, Happiness, Kids, One Hour Photo, and Boys Don't Cry. Through her enduring relationship with Todd, she has worked on every feature film of his to date, including Safe, Velvet Goldmine, Far From Heaven, and I'm Not There, which starred Christian Bale, Cate Blanchett, Richard Gere, Heath Ledger, Charlotte Gainsbourg, Julianne Moore, and Michelle Williams. Cate Blanchett received both Academy Award and SAG Award nominations for Best Supporting Actress, and the film was also nominated for 4 Independent Spirit Awards, notching a Best Supporting Actress win for Cate Blanchett.

In 2008, Vachon won an Emmy for her role as executive producer for the TV adaptation of Ira Glass's This American Life.

Killer's releases for 2008 include Savage Grace, directed by Tom Kalin and starring Julianne Moore; An American Crime, starring Catherine Keener and Elliot Page, directed by Tommy O'Haver: Then She Found Me, the directorial debut of Helen Hunt, starring herself, Bette Midler, Colin Firth and Matthew Broderick.

Vachon continued her long-standing collaboration with Todd Haynes for the 2015 film, Carol.

Vachon is the Artistic Director of the MFA Program at Stony Brook Manhattan.

Personal life
Vachon and her partner, artist Marlene McCarty, live in the East Village of New York with their daughter Guthrie. In the fall of 2009, Vachon went into remission after a battle with breast cancer. She is related to the French costume designer, Sarah Monfort.

Awards and juries

Awards
 1994: Frameline – San Francisco International LGBT Film Festival, Award Outstanding Achievement in Lesbian and Gay Media
 1996: New York Women in Film and Television, Muse Award for Outstanding Vision and Achievement
 1999: IFP, Gotham Award for producing
 2000: Provincetown International Film Festival, Provincetown Filmmaker on the Edge Award to Vachon and Killer Films
 2003: New York Film Critics Circle, Far from Heaven
 2003: National Board of Review, Producers Award
 2007: Woodstock Film Festival, Honorary Maverick Award
 Vachon and Killer Films were given special tributes from the SXSW and Deauville Film Festivals.

Juries
 1993: Sundance Film Festival, dramatic jury member
 2005: Venice Film Festival, jury member
 2005: Sundance Film Festival, dramatic jury member
 2010: Sarajevo Film Festival, jury member
 2012: 60th San Sebastián International Film Festival, member and jury president

Filmography as producer
Director's name in brackets after film title.

 1991: Poison (Todd Haynes)
 1992: Swoon (Tom Kalin)
 1994: Postcards from America (Steve McLean)
 1994: Go Fish (Rose Troche) (as executive producer)
 1995: Stonewall (Nigel Finch)
 1995: Safe (Todd Haynes)
 1995: Kids (Larry Clark)
 1996: I Shot Andy Warhol (Mary Harron)
 1997: Office Killer (Cindy Sherman)
 1997: Kiss Me, Guido (Tony Vitale)
 1998: Velvet Goldmine (Todd Haynes)
 1998: I'm Losing You (Bruce Wagner)
 1998: Happiness (Todd Solondz)
 1999: Boys Don't Cry (Kimberly Peirce)
 2000: Crime and Punishment in Suburbia (Rob Schmidt)
 2001: Hedwig and the Angry Inch (John Cameron Mitchell)
 2001: Series 7: The Contenders (Daniel Minahan)
 2001: Women in Film (Bruce Wagner)
 2001: Chelsea Walls (Ethan Hawke)
 2001: Storytelling (Todd Solondz)
 2002: One Hour Photo (Mark Romanek)
 2001: The Grey Zone (Tim Blake Nelson)
 2001: The Safety of Objects (Rose Troche)
 2002: Far from Heaven (Todd Haynes)
 2003: Party Monster (Fenton Bailey and Randy Barbato)
 2003: Camp (Todd Graff)
 2003: The Company (Robert Altman)
 2004: A Home at the End of the World (Michael Mayer)
 2004: A Dirty Shame (John Waters)
 2005: The Notorious Bettie Page (Mary Harron)
 2005: Mrs. Harris (Phyllis Nagy)
 2006: Infamous (Douglas McGrath)
 2007: This American Life (Ira Glass)
 2007: An American Crime (Tommy O'Haver)
 2007: I'm Not There (Todd Haynes)
 2007: Then She Found Me (Helen Hunt)
 2008: Savage Grace (Tom Kalin)
 2008: Gigantic (Matt Aselton)
 2009: Motherhood (Katherine Dieckmann)
 2009: Cracks (Jordan Scott)
 2009: Cairo Time (Ruba Nadda)
 2010: Lulu at the Hotel (short) (Maya Kazan)
 2010: Loop Planes (short) (Robin Wilby)
 2010: Charley (short) (Dee Austin Robertson)
 2010: Dirty Girl (Abe Sylvia)
 2010: What's Wrong with Virginia (Dustin Lance Black)
 2010: Lullaby for Pi (Benoit Philippon)
 2013: Deep Powder (Mo Ogordnik)
 2013: The Last of Robin Hood (Wash Westmoreland and Richard Glatzer)
 2013: Innocence (Hilary Brougher)
 2014: Still Alice (Wash Westmoreland and Richard Glatzer)
 2015: Nasty Baby (Sebastián Silva)
 2015: Carol (Todd Haynes)
 2016: Goat (Andrew Neel)
 2016: Wiener-Dog (Todd Solondz)
 2016: White Girl (Elizabeth Wood)
 2016: A Kind of Murder (Andy Goddard)
 2016: Frank & Lola (Matthew Ross) (as executive producer)
 2017: Dina (Dan Sickels & Antonio Santini)
 2017: Lemon (Janicza Bravo)
 2017: Where Is Kyra? (Andrew Dosunmu)
 2017: Beatriz at Dinner (Miguel Arteta)
 2017: Wonderstruck (Todd Haynes)
 2017: First Reformed (Paul Schrader)
 2017: Mercy (Tali Shalom-Ezer)
 2018: Colette (Wash Westmoreland)
 2018: Vox Lux (Brady Corbet)
 2019: Dark Waters (Todd Haynes)
 2020: Zola (Janicza Bravo)
 2020: Shirley (Josephine Decker)
 2020: The World to Come (Mona Fastvold)
 2020: Brothers by Blood (Jeremie Guez)
 2021: Pride (documentary series)
 2021: The Velvet Underground (Todd Haynes)
 2022: Anything's Possible (Billy Porter)
 2023: Past Lives (Celine Song)

Works and publications
 Schamus, James, Barry Ellsworth, Todd Haynes, and Christine Vachon. The Apparatus Guide to No-Budget Filmmaking in New York City. New York: Apparatus Productions, 1989. 
 Vachon, Christine, and David Edelstein. Shooting to Kill: How an Independent Producer Blasts Through the Barriers to Make Movies That Matter. New York: Harper Perennial, 2002. Reprint of 1998 edition.  
 Vachon, Christine, and Austin Bunn. A Killer Life: How an Independent Film Producer Survives Deals and Disasters in Hollywood and Beyond. New York: Simon & Schuster, 2006.   2007 Limelight Edition.

References

External links
 
 Killer Films
 Christine Vachon (February 24, 2017). Film-makers can defy Trump. Depicting the lives of others is an act of resistance. The Guardian

1962 births
Living people
American women film producers
Film producers from New York (state)
LGBT film producers
LGBT people from New York (state)
Brown University alumni
People from Manhattan
21st-century American LGBT people
21st-century American women